Clog Dance: The Very Best of Violinski is a compilation album by Violinski. It marked the first time a lot of Violinski's songs had appeared on CD, the reason being that their original master tapes had been missing for over 20 years and had only just been discovered in an unmarked London tape vault.

Track listing
 "Clog Dance" (Marcangelo)
 From the album "No Cause for Alarm"
 "Silent Love" (de Albuquerque)
 From the album "Stop Cloning About"
 "Captain Dandy" (Hodgson)
 From the album "Stop Cloning About"
 "Save Me" (Hodgson)
 From the album "No Cause For Alarm"
 "What's Your Game" (Marcangelo)
 From the album "Stop Cloning About"
 "Princess of Darkness" (Instrumental rough mix) (Marcangelo)
 Previously unreleased early version of "Cow"
 "Caped Crusader" (Hodgson)
 From the album "No Cause For Alarm"
 "Hide It" (Kaminski, de Albuquerque)
 From the album "Stop Cloning About"
 "I Don't Know (Mik's Song)" (Alternate take) (Kaminski)
 Previously unreleased early version of "Time to Live"
 "Clear Away" (Kaminski)
 From the album "Stop Cloning About"
 "Tango" (Instrumental rough mix) (Hodgson)
 Previously unreleased early version of "(More Than A) Sudden Romance"
 "Ruby Rhythms" (Alternate early mix) (Marcangelo)
 Previously unreleased alternate version
 "No Cause For Alarm" (Early version) (Marcangelo)
 Previously unreleased early version
 "Need Your Love" (Instrumental rough mix) (Hodgson)
 Previously unreleased early instrumental version
 "Rock Steady" (Hodgson)
 Previously unreleased demo recording
 "Scenario" (Alternate early mix) (Marcangelo)
 Previously unreleased alternate version
 "Borderlands" (Instrumental early version) (Marcangelo)
 Previously unreleased
 "Mirrored Mirror" (Hodgson)
 From the album "Stop Cloning About"
 "Home to Tea" (Alternate early mix) (de Albuquerque)
 Previously unreleased alternate version
 "Clog Dance" (Rock version) (Marcangelo)
 Previously unreleased alternate take

Personnel
John Hodgson – Drums, percussion
Mik Kaminski – Barcus Berry violin
John Marcangelo - Piano, keyboards, percussion
Baz Dunnery - Vocals, guitar
Andy Brown - Vocals, bass guitar
Mike de Albuquerque – Vocals, guitar, bass guitar
Paul Mann - Vocals, bass guitar
Ian Whitmore - Vocals (tracks 3, 10, 18)
Bob Brady - Vocals (track 15)

References

2007 greatest hits albums
Violinski albums